Theodore Paul Wright (May 25, 1895 – August 21, 1970), also known as T. P. Wright, was a U.S. aeronautical engineer and educator.

Biography

He was born in Galesburg, Illinois on May 25, 1895. His father was the economist Philip Green Wright and his brothers were the geneticist Sewall Wright and the political scientist Quincy Wright. He graduated from Lombard College and Massachusetts Institute of Technology. He served in World War I.

In 1936, he published an important paper entitled "Factors affecting the costs of airplanes" which describes what is known as Wright's law or experience curve effects. The paper describes that "we learn by doing" and that the cost of each unit produced decreases as a function of the cumulative number of units produced. 

He served as administrator of the Civil Aeronautics Administration during 1944–1948. When President Truman announced Wright’s resignation as Administrator of Civil Aeronautics on January 16, 1948, the New York Times reported that Wright felt he could not continue in office at a salary of $10,000 per year.

He served as Cornell University's vice president in charge of research from 1948 to 1960 and served as acting president of Cornell University in 1951. He died on August 21, 1970.

Awards
Wright Brothers Medal (1930)
Honorary Doctorate from Knox College (1937)
Daniel Guggenheim Medal (1945)

See also
 Learning curve
Experience curve effects

References

External links 
Wright, Theodore Paul (1895-1970) Harvard Square Library
Theodore Paul Wright papers, 1911-1970. Cornell Library

1895 births
1970 deaths
Cornell University faculty
American aerospace engineers
20th-century American educators
Lombard College alumni
20th-century American engineers